"Just a Girl" is a 1995 song by No Doubt

Just a Girl may also refer to:

Music
Just a Girl (album) or the title song, by Bonnie Pink, 2001
"Just a Girl", a song by Miley Cyrus as Hannah Montana from Hannah Montana 3, 2009
"Just A Girl", a song by the Pale Fountains from Pacific Street, 1984
"Just a Girl", a song by Pearl Jam from Ten, 2009 reissue

Other media
Just a Girl; or, The Strange Duchess, an 1895 novel by Charles Garvice
Just a Girl (film), a 1916 film adaptation of the novel
Just a Girl, a 2004 manga by Tomoko Taniguchi

See also
I'm Just a Girl, a 2003 album by Deana Carter
"I'm Just a Girl" (Deana Carter song), the title song
"I'm Just a Girl" (Bachelor Girl song), 2002
"Just the Girl", a 2005 song by the Click Five